Oliver White may refer to:
 Oliver White (cricketer)
 Oliver White (soccer)

See also
 Oliver White Tavern, a historic former tavern in Bolton, Connecticut